Andere Basterra Aspe (born 5 October 2000) is a Spanish professional racing cyclist, who most recently rode for UCI Women's Continental Team .

References

External links
 

2000 births
Living people
Spanish female cyclists
Place of birth missing (living people)
People from Enkarterri
Sportspeople from Biscay
Cyclists from the Basque Country (autonomous community)
21st-century Spanish women